Harold Thomas Springthorpe (28 April 1886 – 3 November 1915) was an English amateur football inside forward who played in the Football League for Grimsby Town. He represented the England amateur national team and English Wanderers.

Personal life 
Springthorpe attended Stamford School and trained as a bank clerk before working for Barclays. He transferred to the Grimsby branch. After the outbreak of the First World War, Springthorpe enlisted as a lance corporal in the Lincolnshire Yeomanry in October 1914. The unit was being transported to Salonika aboard the SS Mercian on 3 November 1915 when the ship was attacked in the Mediterranean by SM U-38. Springthorpe died of wounds caused by a shell blast during the hour-long bombardment and was buried at sea. He is commemorated on the Helles Memorial.

References

1886 births
1915 deaths
Sportspeople from Rutland
English footballers
English Football League players
Association football inside forwards
Northampton Town F.C. players
Grimsby Town F.C. players
British Army personnel of World War I
Lincolnshire Yeomanry soldiers
British military personnel killed in World War I
England amateur international footballers
Southern Football League players
People educated at Stamford School
Burials at sea